Cloudy with a Chance of Meatballs is a 1978 children's book by Judi and Ron Barrett.

Cloudy with a Chance of Meatballs may also refer to:

 Cloudy with a Chance of Meatballs (film), the 2009 film based on the book
 Cloudy with a Chance of Meatballs (franchise), the resulting film franchise
 Cloudy with a Chance of Meatballs (TV series), the 2017 TV series based on the film
 Cloudy with a Chance of Meatballs (video game), the 2009 video game based on the film